The 1995 Team Ice Racing World Championship was the 17th edition of the Team World Championship. The final was held on 25/26 February, 1995, in Frankfurt, in Germany. Sweden won their first ever title defeating Russia by one point.

Final Classification

See also 
 1995 Individual Ice Speedway World Championship
 1995 Speedway World Team Cup in classic speedway
 1995 Speedway Grand Prix in classic speedway

References 

Ice speedway competitions
World